Anelaphus bupalpus is a species of beetle in the family Cerambycidae. It was described by Chemsak in 1991.

References

bupalpus
Beetles described in 1991